Otto Wilhelm Eduard Erdmann (7 December 1834, Leipzig - 9 December 1905, Düsseldorf) was a German genre painter in the Rococo Revival style.

Biography 
His father was the chemist, Otto Linné Erdmann. He began his artistic education at the Leipziger Akademie and later attended the Dresden Academy of Fine Arts, followed by the Academy of Fine Arts, Munich, where he studied with the genre painter, Ludwig von Hagn. In 1858, he settled in Düsseldorf, where he began to specialize in Rococo Revival paintings, largely set in a light-hearted court environment.

He was a member of the artists' association, "Malkasten", and sat on its board of directors for many years. He was also an amateur actor. In 1898, he was awarded the Order of the Red Eagle. In addition to his paintings, he created illustrations; notably for the inaugural edition of the Belgian journal, L'Illustration Européenne in 1870.

Gallery

References

Further reading 
 Babette Marie Warncke: Rokoko-Mode. Rokokorezeption in der deutschen Malerei des 19. Jahrhunderts. Dissertation an der Albert-Ludwigs-Universität, Freiburg im Breisgau 1995, S. 50 ff. (Online)
 Erdmann, Otto. In: Friedrich von Boetticher: Malerwerke des neunzehnten Jahrhunderts. Beitrag zur Kunstgeschichte. Dresden 1891, Vol.1, pg.275

External links

ArtNet: More works by Erdmann.

19th-century German painters
19th-century German male artists
German male painters
20th-century German painters
20th-century German male artists
1834 births
1905 deaths
Artists from Leipzig
German genre painters